Mary Youngblood (Aleut/Seminole) is a Native American musician, and performer of the Native American flute.

Life and career
Mary Youngblood was born in Kirkland, Washington, and adopted as a child by Dr. Bob and Leah Edwards, both educators.

She has been awarded three Native American Music Awards, being the first female artist to win "Flutist of the Year," which she won in both 1999 and 2000, as well as winning "Best Female Artist" in 2000. She is also the first Native American woman to have received a Grammy Award for "Best Native American Music Album", and the first Native American woman to have won two Grammys, the first for Beneath the Raven Moon in 2002 and Dance with the Wind in 2006.

In 2007 Mary Youngblood composed and played the flute music on the soundtrack for documentary film, "The Spirit of Sacajawea."

Ms. Youngblood is on the advisory board of the World Flute Society.

The Library of Congress maintains eight of Mary Youngblood's sound recordings.

Discography
Sacred Place: A Mary Youngblood Collection 2008, Silver Wave
Dance with the Wind 2006, Silver Wave
Feed the Fire 2004, Silver Wave
Beneath the Raven Moon 2002, Silver Wave
Heart of the World 1999, Silver Wave
The Offering 1998, Silver Wave

Sheet music
Three of her albums have been published as books of sheet music transcribed for Native American flute:
 The Offering 
 Heart of the World 
 Beneath the Raven Moon

Her work has been included in the following compilations and soundtracks:
Voice of the Wind with Mary Youngblood & Michael Bayard (Live CD&DVD) 2016, Pure Motion Media
My Mothers Garden by Singer-Songwriter Thea
Bears with Joanne Shenandoah, Lawrence Laughing, Lyle Lovett, Alice Gomez, and Claude Carmichael
Prayer for Peace featuring Michel Cusson, and with Mary Youngblood, Joanne Shenandoah
Many Blessings: A Native American Celebration with Lawrence Laughing, Joanne Shenandoah, Alice Gomez, Robert Mirabal, Tito La Rosa, and Peter Kater
Sacred Ground: A Tribute to Mother Earth with Robert Mirabal, Star Nayea, Bill Miller, Joanne Shenandoah, Little Wolf Band, and Walela

References

External links 

1958 births
Living people
20th-century Native Americans
21st-century Native Americans
Alaska Native people
Aleut people
Grammy Award winners
Native American flautists
Native American flute players
Seminole people
Women flautists
20th-century Native American women
21st-century Native American women
People from Kirkland, Washington
Musicians from Washington (state)